The V.C. Corner Australian Cemetery and Memorial is a Commonwealth War Graves Commission  World War I cemetery and memorial.

Battle of Fromelles

The Battle of Fromelles in July 1916 is significant as the first occasion on which the First Australian Imperial Force (AIF) saw action on the Western Front.

The battle is widely regarded as a disaster for the Allies, and has been described as "the worst 24 hours in Australia's entire history." It resulted from a plan to divert German attention from the Battle of the Somme, but historians estimate that 5,500 Australians and 2,000 British troops were killed or wounded. The Australian losses were equivalent to the combined total Australian losses in the Boer War, Korean War and Vietnam War: although later World War I actions would be more deadly for the AIF, Fromelles was the only one to achieve no success.

Adolf Hitler is believed to have served as a messenger on the German side with the 6th Bavarian Reserve Division.

Cemetery and memorial
The site was constructed in 1920 and 1921: The name VC Corner has no obvious relation to actions in the region of Fromelles. It might just refer to a nickname soldiers gave the area during the war referring either to the bravery of the Australian troops or the danger of the place that demanded  bravery to be held.

The cemetery contains 410 unidentified bodies retrieved from the battlefield after the Armistice, that is, more than two years after the battle. There are no headstones in the cemetery, two large concrete crosses laid face down in the grass mark where the soldiers are buried. Although the graves are not individually marked, these are individual graves, not a mass grave, as can be seen on the CWGC cemetery plan. There is also a Cross of Sacrifice.

The memorial lists almost 1,300 Australian soldiers who were lost in the battle and who have no known resting place. Of these, 711 are buried as "Known unto God" in other local cemeteries such as the Le Trou Aid Post Cemetery and the Rue-du-Bois Military Cemetery. The bodies of another 160 AIF soldiers (and 239 British soldiers) were recovered by the Germans after the battle and buried behind German lines, their names and personal belongings being passed to the Red Cross. In May 2008, the remains of some of these soldiers were finally located in mass graves on the outskirts of Fromelles. A total of 250 British and Australian soldiers from this site are being reburied in the Fromelles (Pheasant Wood) Military Cemetery.

See also

 List of Australian military memorials
 Mont Saint-Quentin Australian war memorial
 Villers–Bretonneux Australian National Memorial
 Military Memorials of National Significance in Australia

Notes

References

External links

 
 Australian Department of Veteran's Affairs site, with photographs, access details and testimonies from soldiers who fought at Fromelles (including Simon Fraser)
 Video of VC Corner and Australian Memorial Park, Fromelles. Jason Fielding
Account of the battle, including references to the cemetery and memorial (Ekins, Ashley, 'The battle of Fromelles', Wartime 44 (2008) 18–23)
 Details and photos of the cemetery, memorial and memorial park

Australian military cemeteries
Australian military memorials
Cemeteries in Nord (French department)
Commonwealth War Graves Commission cemeteries in France
Commonwealth War Graves Commission memorials
World War I memorials in France
Australian diaspora in Europe